Madieae is a tribe of flowering plants in the family Asteraceae.  It is sometimes considered a subtribe of Heliantheae. Notable species include the tarweeds of the Western United States as well as the silverswords of Hawaii.

Subtribes and genera
Madieae subtribes and genera recognized by the Global Compositae Database as of April 2022:
Subtribe Arnicinae 
Arnica 
Subtribe Baeriinae 
Amblyopappus 
Baeriopsis 
Constancea 
Eriophyllum 
Lasthenia 
Monolopia 
Pseudobahia 
Syntrichopappus 
Subtribe Hulseinae 
Eatonella 
Hulsea 
Subtribe Madiinae 
Achyrachaena 
Adenothamnus 
Anisocarpus 
Argyroxiphium 
Blepharipappus 
Blepharizonia 
Calycadenia 
Carlquistia 
Centromadia 
Deinandra 
Dubautia 
Harmonia 
Hemizonella 
Hemizonia 
Holocarpha 
Holozonia 
Jensia 
Kyhosia 
Lagophylla 
Layia 
Madia 
Osmadenia 
Raillardella 
Wilkesia 
Subtribe Venegasiinae 
Venegasia

References

 
Asteraceae tribes